Dionysis Diakos (Greek: Διονύσης Διάκος, 1805-1887) was a Greek revolutionary leader during the Greek War of Independence.  He was born in Pyrgos and descended from a family or operators and revolutionary leaders.  He was a runner for Pyrgos.  He took part in a battle against Ibrahim and the fortress of Kastro.  With the sack of the fortress, he was captured and subsequently ransomed.  He was a major with Falangos.  He died in 1884 at the age of 90.

References
The first version of the article is translated and is based from the article at the Greek Wikipedia (el:Main Page)

1794 births
1884 deaths
Greek people of the Greek War of Independence
People from Pyrgos, Elis